The Telegraph & Argus is the daily newspaper for Bradford, West Yorkshire, England. It is published six times each week, from Monday to Saturday inclusive. The newspaper has offices in Newhall Way, Bradford, from where its journalists work. Locally, the paper is known as the T&A. It also breaks news 24/7 on its website, which is viewed by more than 1.3 million users each month.

Overview 
Founded in 1868, the paper was a broadsheet until 1989 when it became tabloid. It features a range of news, features, sport, lifestyle articles, classified advertising and special supplements.

The Telegraph & Argus is owned by Newsquest, the second largest publisher of regional newspapers in the United Kingdom, which is owned by the American media empire Gannett. Perry Austin-Clarke was editor from 1992 to 2017, making him the paper's longest-serving editor. As of 2017, the editor was Nigel Burton.

History

The Argus Weekly occupied Argus Chambers in the Britannia House building over a century ago. The Yorkshire Evening Argus and the Bradford Daily Telegraph newspapers later combined to form the Bradford Telegraph & Argus, which has occupied its present building, the former Milligan and Forbes Warehouse for some decades. "Bradford" was dropped from the title in the 1930s, when the paper's circulation area spread across much of West Yorkshire. At one time it had branch offices in nine towns across the region, as well as an office in Morecambe, the Lancashire coastal resort to which many Bradfordians went to retire. At its height the paper's daily sale exceeded 130,000. It is now about one tenth of that figure. Thirty-six years ago a new wing with a skin of dark glass was added to house the printing presses, and these machines can be seen through the windows from the street. However, they are no longer to be seen working, since the newspaper further reduced it economic connection with the city in November 2014 by moving its printing operation to Middlesbrough, in Teesside, while making its Bradford press room staff redundant. Much of the newspaper's advertising content is now typeset in India.
There are plans to sell the building itself now that the presses have been sold off piecemeal.

1936 Abdication Crisis
On 1 December 1936, it was reporter Ronald Harker from the Telegraph and Argus whose report on a speech by Bishop Alfred Blunt of Bradford casting oblique doubt on the piety of King Edward VIII, when referred to the Press Association, sparked the public controversy surrounding the Abdication Crisis. News of Bishop Blunt's doubts also provoked contrary opinions, such as those of Darlington clergyman the Rev. Robert Anderson Jardine, who subsequently conducted the wedding service of the Duke of Windsor and Wallis Warfield.

See also

 Bishop Alfred Blunt#Speech and abdication crisis

References

External links

Newspapers published in Yorkshire
Mass media in Bradford
Newspapers published by Newsquest
Publications established in 1868
1868 establishments in England
Daily newspapers published in the United Kingdom
Publishing companies established in 1868
British companies established in 1868
Abdication of Edward VIII